Walid "Tatta" Atta (born 28 August 1986) is an Ethiopian footballer who plays as a centre back for Hittarps IK.

Career

AIK
In January 2008, Atta joined Swedish top-division side AIK, but was immediately loaned back to Väsby. He made his first appearance for his new club on 10 April 2008 against GIF Sundsvall at Råsunda Stadium, playing the full game in defence. In the summer of 2010, Atta's situation at AIK came in doubt when he turned down a contract extension with the club. Together with his agent, he cut off the negotiations with AIK, and stated that he wanted to await bids from clubs outside of Sweden. This angered the AIK supporters, and in the 2–1 win against IF Brommapojkarna, parts of the crowd openly showed their disappointment. Some organized supporters demanded Atta to be disbanded from playing in AIK until he signed a new deal with the club. The club board followed the demands and stopped Atta from participate in AIK's Europa League qualification game against PFC Levski Sofia. In 2010, Atta was sold to Croatian First Division side NK Lokomotiva.

Dinamo Zagreb
After one season in Lokomotiva, he signed a 5-year contract with Croatian giants Dinamo Zagreb. However, his time at Dinamo was not prosperous, making no appearances apart from a friendly against GOŠK Gabela. In January 2012, the contract was terminated by mutual consent and Atta became a free agent.

Helsingborgs IF

Soon after becoming a free agent, Atta was signed by Allsvenskan side Helsingborgs IF. He has since become a regular in the starting eleven.

BK Häcken
On 6 March 2014 Atta signed with BK Häcken prior to start of the 2014 Allsvenskan campaign.

Hittarps IK
On 13 February 2019, Atta joined Hittarps IK.

International

In 2008, Atta also became a member of the Swedish U-21 team, making his debut in a friendly against Ukraine on 5 February 2008, in Alcanena, Portugal. He played a total of 3 matches for the Swedish U-21 team. In October 2013 he decided to represent Ethiopia at senior level. Atta was supposed to make his debut against Nigeria in the African play-offs for the World Cup in Brazil, but the needed papers did not arrive in time. He finally made his debut in a qualifiers match for the 2015 CAF against Mali in Addis Ababa. Ethiopia lost that match in Addis Ababa but won the second leg in Mali. Walid played in both these matches.

Honours
AIK
 Allsvenskan: 2009
 Svenska Cupen: 2009
 Svenska Supercupen: 2010
Helsingborgs IF
 Svenska Supercupen: 2012

References

External links
 Walid Atta at aikfotboll.se 
 Walid Atta at Playerhistory.com
 

1986 births
Living people
Sportspeople from Riyadh
Ethiopian footballers
Ethiopian expatriate footballers
Ethiopia international footballers
Ethiopian people of Eritrean descent
Swedish footballers
Sweden youth international footballers
Swedish people of Ethiopian descent
Swedish sportspeople of African descent
Sportspeople of Ethiopian descent
Swedish people of Eritrean descent
Swedish expatriate footballers
Association football defenders
AIK Fotboll players
AFC Eskilstuna players
Allsvenskan players
Superettan players
NK Lokomotiva Zagreb players
GNK Dinamo Zagreb players
BK Häcken players
Najran SC players
Khaleej FC players
Saudi First Division League players
Gençlerbirliği S.K. footballers
Croatian Football League players
Expatriate footballers in Croatia
Expatriate footballers in Turkey
Östersunds FK players
Süper Lig players
Sogndal Fotball players